Michael Cuscuna (born September 20, 1949, in Stamford, Connecticut, United States) is an American jazz record producer and writer. He is the co-founder of Mosaic Records and a discographer of Blue Note Records.

Cuscuna played drums, saxophone and flute while young, but placed his emphasis on founding his own record label. He had a jazz show on WXPN and worked for ESP-Disk late in the 1960s, in addition to writing for Jazz & Pop Magazine and Down Beat. He moved from WXPN to WMMR in 1970, then onto WABC-FM (now WPLJ) as a progressive rock DJ at both stations. He took a position as a producer with Atlantic Records in the 1970s, recording Dave Brubeck and the Art Ensemble of Chicago. In the early 1970s, he also produced albums by Bonnie Raitt (Give It Up) and Chris Smither. He also worked at Motown, ABC (for reissues of Impulse! albums), Arista, Muse, Freedom, Elektra and Novus. From 1975 to 1981, he searched the Blue Note archive for previously unissued sessions which began to be issued during this period.

In collaboration with business partner Charlie Lourie, he founded Mosaic Records in 1983 specializing in jazz reissue box sets sold by mail order, still active as of 2018. Artists surveyed include highly visible masters like Thelonious Monk, Miles Davis, and Nat "King" Cole, and lesser known artists such as Tina Brooks and Ike Quebec. Cuscuna has won three Grammy Awards for his releases. In 1984, Cuscuna became a special consultant, producer, and reissue director of Blue Note Records.

Grammy Awards
 1992: Best Historical Album for Nat King Cole, The Complete Capitol Trio Recordings
 1998: Best Album Notes for Miles Davis, Miles Davis Quintet, 1965–68: The Complete Columbia Studio Recordings (with Bob Belden and Todd Coolman)
 2001: Best Historical Album for Billie Holiday, Lady Day: The Complete Billie Holiday on Columbia (1933–1944) (with Michael Brooks)

References

1949 births
Living people
Writers from Stamford, Connecticut
Record producers from Connecticut
American music critics
Jazz record producers